Jonathan Robinson (born 9 November 1982) is an Irish cricketer. He made his Twenty20 cricket debut for North West Warriors in the 2017 Inter-Provincial Trophy on 26 May 2017.

References

External links
 

1982 births
Living people
Irish cricketers
North West Warriors cricketers
Sportspeople from Derry (city)